Grevillea baxteri, commonly known as the Cape Arid grevillea,  is a flowering plant of the family Proteaceae and is endemic to the south-west of Western Australia. It is an erect to spreading shrub with pinnatipartite leaves and greenish to fawn or creamy-orange flowers.

Description

Taxonomy
Grevillea baxteri was first formally described in 1810 by Robert Brown in his Supplementum primum prodromi florae Novae Hollandiae. The specific epithet (baxteri) honours William Baxter.

Distribution and habitat
Cape Arid grevillea grows on sandplains in heath and mallee from near Truslove and Scadden to Israelite Bay in the Esperance Plains and Mallee biogeographic regions of south-western Western Australia.

Conservation status
This grevillea is listed as "Priority Four" by the Government of Western Australia Department of Biodiversity, Conservation and Attractions, meaning that is rare or near threatened.

References

Eudicots of Western Australia
baxteri
Plants described in 1830